Clássico das Emoções in Portuguese or The Derby of the Emotions in English, it is the regional name used in Pernambuco for the football game between Clube Náutico Capibaribe and Santa Cruz Futebol Clube. This derby was first played on May 26, 1918.

History statistics
Played Games – 531
Wins of Náutico – 171
Wins of Santa Cruz – 203
Draws – 157
Goals of Náutico – 733
Goals of Santa Cruz – 823

Titles comparison

First Clássico das Emoções
June 29, 1917
Santa Cruz 3–0 Náutico 
Estádio Eládio de Barros Carvalho

Best attendance ever
December 18, 1983
Santa Cruz 1–1 Náutico
Arruda stadium
Attendance – 76,636 people

Derby top goalscorer
Náutico – Baiano (15 goals) and Bita (13 goals)
Santa Cruz – Tará (17 goals) and Betinho (14 goals)

Last game: April 2022
Náutico 0 (4) x (3) 0 Santa Cruz
Náutico Penalty Goals: Hereda, Pedro Vitor, Amarildo and Júnior Tavares
Santa Cruz Penalty Goals: Esquerdinha, Rodrigo Yuri and Marcos Martins
Stadium: Aflitos
Referee: Deborah Cecilia Cruz Correia

See also
Clássico dos Clássicos
Campeonato Pernambucano

Brazilian football derbies
Clube Náutico Capibaribe
Santa Cruz Futebol Clube
Campeonato Pernambucano